Northfield railway station serves the Northfield area of Birmingham, England. It is situated on the Cross-City Line, and is managed by West Midlands Trains, who also operate all of the rail services that serve it.

History

The station was opened on 1 September 1870 by the Midland Railway. In 1892, the line through Northfield was quadrupled (though only the inner pair of lines had platform access).

In 1913 it was the subject of an arson attack by suffragettes. The fire was extinguished before serious damage was done.

The station was placed under threat of closure in 1963, when the suburban service to Redditch was listed for withdrawal in the Beeching Report and its frequency cut significantly.  Following widespread public opposition and a campaign by local MPs, the route was subsequently reprieved in 1965 but for the next thirteen years it only received a limited service (just four return trips per day to & from New Street).

Northfield received new slow line platforms as part of the £7.4 million upgrade package. and other improvements to the designs of the architect John Broome Since then, the station has received a regular interval service from Birmingham and a variety of other improvements (notably the extension of the route at both ends in the 1980s and electrification in 1993).

In 2013, lifts were built on both sides of the subway to allow disabled access to both platforms.

It currently has two operational platforms, numbered '1' and '4', with a disused island platform in the centre of the four-track lines.

Station masters

J.W. Brookes 1870 - 1875
Edgar Roach 1875 - 1884 
William Morton 1884 - 1915 - ????
J.W Hook 1919 - ???? (formerly station master at Wadborough)
Harry Ariss 1937  - ca. 1940 (afterwards station master at Water Orton)
Fernley W. Maker 1952 - 1957
F.G. Courtney 1957 - ????

Services

All rail services at the station are provided by West Midlands Trains, on the Cross-City Line.

All the services at this station are operated by Class 323s electric trains.

Service Frequency:

4 trains per hour in each direction (Mon-Sat daytimes).

3 trains per hour in each direction (on Sundays)

Northbound services terminate at either Four Oaks, Lichfield Trent Valley or (on Sunday services from Bromsgrove) Birmingham New Street.

Southbound services terminate at either Bromsgrove or Redditch.

Connections 

National Express West Midlands route 46 (Northfield - Queen Elizabeth Hospital via Kings Norton) stops on nearby Church Hill.

Kev’s Cars and Coaches routes 19 (Maypole - Rubery) and 42 (Northfield - Queen Elizabeth Hospital via Rubery) stops directly outside the station building.

Facilities
The station has a ticket office and Automated Ticket Machines. The station is also equipped with Real-Time Information boards and recorded announcements.

The station has a small car park, provided free by Transport for West Midlands.

References

External links

Rail Around Birmingham and the West Midlands: Northfield railway station
Warwickshire Railways page

Railway stations in Birmingham, West Midlands
DfT Category E stations
Former Midland Railway stations
Railway stations in Great Britain opened in 1870
Railway stations in Great Britain closed in 1893
Railway stations in Great Britain opened in 1893
Railway stations served by West Midlands Trains
John Broome railway stations